National Stadium station is a BTS Skytrain station on the Silom Line in Pathum Wan District, Bangkok, Thailand.

Nearby landmarks

The station is located on Rama I Road to the west of Pathum Wan intersection, where the National Stadium, MBK Center, Siam Discovery Center, Bangkok Art and Culture Centre and Siam Square are situated and all linked to the station by skybridge. It is also in walking distance to Siam Center and Siam Paragon, which are located at Siam station. Jim Thompson House, a popular Thai silk museum of Jim Thompson, is just opposite the station in Soi Kasemsan 2.

To the west of the station, which is still a terminus, passengers can take the buses or taxis for a short distance to the historical area of Bangkok, where notable attractions are located such as the Grand Palace, Sanam Luang, Wat Pho, the Democracy Monument, Ratchadamnoen Avenue, Giant Swing, Golden Mount and Khaosan Road

Facilities
 Khlong Saen Saep Express Boat service at Saphan Hua Chang (or Ratchathewi) Pier (southern side of Hua Chang bridge) to Pratunam market and Golden Mount

Station layout

Bus connections
BMTA
 11: Prawet – National Stadium
 11: Mega Bangna – National Stadium
 15: Kanlapapruek – Bang Lamphu
 47: Khlong Toei Pier – Department of Lands (Pak Khlong Talat)
 73: Siam Park – Phra Phuttha Yodfa Bridge
 93: Athlete's Village – Si Phraya Pier
 204: Bangkok City Hall (Din Daeng) – Ratchawong Pier
 508: Paknam (Crocodile Farm) – Ratchaworadit Pier
Smart Bus

 48: Ramkhamhaeng University Bangna Campus - Wat Pho
 113: Minburi - Bangkok Railway Station

Exits
 Exit 1: Soi Kasemsan 2, Jim Thompson House Museum, Pathumwan Institute of Technology, Tesco Lotus Rama 1, Bus Stop to Siam (escalator)
 Exit 2: Sala Wachirawut National Stadium, Charoen Phon Intersection, Bus Stop to Yotse (Elevator)
 Exit 3: Bangkok Art and Culture Center (bridge)
 Exit 4: 2nd floor, MBK Center (bridge)
 Exit 5: Wan Siam Bridge connecting Pathumwan Intersection
 MBK Center 2nd and 3rd Floor (Link Bridge)
 Bangkok Art and Culture Center, Anti-Money Laundering Office, Hua Chang Bridge and Saphan Hua Chang Pier
 Siam Square Soi Klang - Soi 2
 Siam Discovery, M floor and 1 (connection bridge)
 The meeting point is at Exit 2, in front of the study of Commerce.

References

BTS Skytrain stations